The Texas Rangers Major League Baseball (MLB) franchise was established in 1961 as the second incarnation of the Washington Senators, an expansion team awarded to Washington, D.C., after the old Washington Senators team of the American League moved to Minnesota and became the Twins. The new Senators remained in Washington through 1971 playing at Griffith Stadium in their first season and at RFK Stadium for the next 10 years. In 1972, the team moved to Arlington, Texas, where it became the Texas Rangers. The Rangers played at Arlington Stadium from 1972 to 1993, Globe Life Park in Arlington from 1994 to 2019. The team moved into Globe Life Field in 2020.

The Senators/Rangers franchise is widely regarded as one of the most unsuccessful organizations in all of North American professional sports. It took the team 36 seasons to finally make the playoffs and they have since made only eight appearances in the MLB postseason, seven following division championships in 1996, 1998, 1999, 2010, 2011, 2015, and 2016 and as a wild card team in 2012. In 2010, the Rangers advanced past the Division Series for the first time, taking 50 years to become the final team of the 30 active clubs to win a first round series, defeating the Tampa Bay Rays. The team then brought home their first American League pennant after beating the New York Yankees in six games. In the 2010 World Series, the franchise's first, the Rangers fell to the San Francisco Giants in five games. They repeated as American League champions the following year, then lost the 2011 World Series to the St. Louis Cardinals in seven games. As of their 61st season, they have the dubious distinction of actively holding the longest current drought amongst all North American pro sports franchises that are yet to win their first league championship, and only the Cleveland Guardians hold a longer MLB title drought.

Washington Senators: 1961–1971

When the original Washington Senators moved to Minnesota in 1960 as the Twins, Major League Baseball decided to expand a year earlier than planned to stave off threats of losing its exemption from the Sherman Antitrust Act. At the winter meetings that year, it awarded a new team to Los Angeles (the Angels) as well as a new team in the nation's capital. This new team adopted the old Senators name, but was (and still is) considered an expansion team since the Twins retained the old Senators' records and history. The Senators and Angels began to fill their rosters with American League players in an expansion draft. The team played the  season at old Griffith Stadium before moving to District of Columbia Stadium (now the Robert F. Kennedy Memorial Stadium). 

For most of their existence, the new Senators were the definition of futility, losing an average of 90 games a season. The team's struggles led to a twist on a joke about the old Senators—"Washington: first in war, first in peace and still last in the American League." Frank Howard, known for his towering home runs, was the team's most accomplished player, winning two home run titles.

Ownership changed hands several times during the franchise's stay in Washington and was often plagued by poor decision-making and planning. Owner Pete Queseda once wondered why he needed to pay players who didn't belong in the majors and later agreed to a ten-year lease at D.C. Stadium—a move that would come back to haunt the Senators. In , Quesada sold his stake in the club and resigned. Washington stockbrokers  James Johnston and James Lemon owned the team briefly, suffering massive financial losses. Short named himself general manager and hired Hall of Famer Ted Williams as manager. Although Williams had never coached or managed at any level of baseball, he seemed to light a spark under the once-moribund Senators. Williams kept them in contention for most of the 1969 season, bringing them in at 86–76 for fourth place in the AL East. Attendance surged to over 918,000, at the time the highest in Washington baseball history.

However, this would not last. Short had borrowed most of the $9.4 million he had paid for the team. Serving as his own general manager, Short was forced to make many questionable trades to service the debt and bring in much-needed revenue. As a result, the team rapidly fell back into the American League's cellar. Fans kept their distance from the Senators while the Baltimore Orioles,  to the northeast, won four American League pennants and two World Series from 1966 through 1971. As it turned out, the 1969 season would be the only time the franchise would manage so much as a .500 record in its first 12 years. As well, the Senators would never approach their 1969 gate again during their stay in Washington; it would remain the franchise record for attendance until 1974–the franchise's fourth year in Texas.

By the end of the  season, Short had issued an ultimatum: unless someone was willing to buy the Senators for $12 million (in comparison, the New York Yankees were sold in 1973 for $8.8 million), he would not renew the stadium lease and move the team elsewhere. At that season's end, Short dealt his best starting pitcher and the left side of his infield to the Detroit Tigers for erstwhile 30-game-winner Denny McLain, who had spent most of the 1970 campaign suspended because of gambling allegations. The deal—alleged by onetime Senators broadcaster Shelby Whitfield to have been made in order to secure the Tigers' vote in favor of the Senators' eventual move to Texas—turned Detroit back into contenders, while McLain was a monumental bust, losing a league-worst 22 games.

Short was especially receptive to an offer from Arlington, Texas mayor Tom Vandergriff, who had been trying to get a Major League team to play in the Metroplex for over a decade. Years earlier, Charles O. Finley, the owner of the Kansas City Athletics, sought to move his team to Dallas, but the idea was rebuffed by the other AL team owners.

However, it had been built to Major League specifications. It was also located in a natural bowl, meaning only minor excavations would be necessary to expand the park to accommodate Major League crowds.

After Vandergriff offered a multimillion-dollar down payment, Short decided to make the move to Arlington. On September 21, 1971, (by a vote of 10–2, the Orioles' Jerold Hoffberger and John Allyn of the Chicago White Sox registering the dissenting votes), American League owners granted approval for the  season.

Senators fans were livid. Enmity came to a head at the club's last game in Washington. Thousands of fans simply walked in without paying after the security guards left early, swelling the paid attendance of 14,460 to around 25,000, while fans unfurled a banner reading "SHORT STINKS". With the Senators leading 7–5 and two outs in the top of the ninth inning, several hundred youths stormed the field, raiding it for souvenirs. One man grabbed first base and ran off with it. With no security in sight and only three bases, umpire crew chief Jim Honochick forfeited the game to the New York Yankees.

However, the Rangers allowed the Nationals to use the curly W logo that originated with the expansion Senators.

Naming of the Rangers

After moving from Washington, the Senators were renamed after the Texas Rangers, the state-wide investigative law-enforcement agency which was founded by Stephen F. Austin in 1823 when Texas was part of Mexico, and whose mythology led to fictional characters such as The Lone Ranger and Walker, Texas Ranger. But the Rangers also had bouts as vigilante squads, when they abused their authority, including by lynching Hispanics. In the wake of 2020's Black Lives Matter protests, prominent mainstream voices have shined a light on the historical racism associated with the law-enforcement agency and called for the baseball team to abandon the Rangers name. The baseball team responded by committing to keeping the Rangers name.

First years in Texas: 1972–1984

During the off-season, improvements were made to Turnpike Stadium, which reopened as Arlington Stadium for the 1972 season. Meanwhile, ownership announced that the franchise would be renamed the Texas Rangers. The team played its first game on April 15, 1972, a 1–0 loss at the California Angels. The next day, the Rangers defeated the Angels 5–1 for the club's first victory. After the season Ted Williams retired as manager; he had made no secret of his displeasure with the franchise's new location. Whitey Herzog was named the new manager, but he was replaced before the end of the 1973 season by Billy Martin.

In 1974, the Rangers began to come into their own as a team. They finished the season second in the American League West with an 84–76 record, behind the eventual World Series champion Oakland Athletics. The 1974 Rangers are still the only MLB team to finish above .500 after two consecutive 100-loss seasons. Mike Hargrove was awarded A.L. Rookie of the Year, Billy Martin was named Manager of the Year, Jeff Burroughs won American League MVP, and Ferguson Jenkins was named the Comeback Player of the Year after winning 25 games, a club record to this day. However, after a 44–51 start in 1975, Martin was fired as the Rangers' manager and was replaced by Frank Lucchesi.

After excellent seasons between 1977 and 1979, the Rangers came very close to clinching a playoff spot in the first half of 1981. But when Texas lost its last game before the players' strike began, the Oakland A's won the AL West in the first half by a half-game. After 1981, the Rangers would not post another winning record for five seasons. During this stretch, the Rangers made one of their most unpopular trades ever, sending multi-Gold Glove catcher and fan favorite Jim Sundberg to the Milwaukee Brewers for future Brewers’ manager Ned Yost, who later managed the Kansas City Royals to the 2015 World Series championship.

The Rangers faced attendance problems for a few years after moving to Texas, in part due to the team's inconsistent performance and in part due to the oppressive heat and humidity that can overtake the area in the summer. Until the Florida (now Miami) Marlins arrived in 1993, Arlington Stadium was often the hottest stadium in the Majors, with temperatures frequently topping  throughout the summer months. In part because of this, the Rangers began playing most of even their weekend games between May and September at night—a tradition that continued until the opening of retractable-roofed Globe Life Field in 2020. Beginning in 1990, the Rangers usually received a waiver from ESPN to play Sunday night games and televise them in the Dallas–Fort Worth area.

The Valentine, Ryan, and Bush years: 1985–1994

Bobby Valentine, who would eventually become the Rangers' longest-serving manager at 1,186 games, became steward over an influx of talent in the late 1980s and early 1990s. A winning season in 1986 was a shock to pundits and fans alike as the Rangers remained in the race for the American League pennant for the entire season. With a team consisting of many stellar young rookies such as Rubén Sierra, Pete Incaviglia, Mitch Williams, Bobby Witt, and Edwin Correa, the Rangers finished in 2nd place with an 87–75 record, just five games behind the division champion California Angels. The season marked a dramatic 25-win improvement over the 1985 season, which resulted in a yet another last-place finish in the West. The signing of 41-year-old star pitcher Nolan Ryan prior to the 1989 season allowed Ryan to reach his 5,000th strikeout, 300th win, and sixth and seventh no-hitters with the Rangers. Coupled with powerful batters like Juan González, Rubén Sierra, Julio Franco, and Rafael Palmeiro and a pitching staff that also included Charlie Hough, Bobby Witt, Kevin Brown, and Kenny Rogers, fans held high expectations for the Rangers. However, the team never posted a finish higher than second place and Valentine was relieved of his duties during the 1992 season.

In April 1989, Rangers owner and oil tycoon Eddie Chiles, sold the team to an investment group headed by George W. Bush, son of the President of the United States, George H. W. Bush. After hearing that Chiles planned to sell the team, Bush headed a group of investors that bought the team for $89 million. While his own equity in the team was a small one (about ten percent), he was named Managing General Partner of the new ownership group. He increased his investment the following year.

During his tenure, the Rangers and the City of Arlington decided to replace the aging Arlington Stadium with a new publicly funded stadium, at a cost of $193 million, financed by Arlington residents, through a sales tax increase. Ground was broken on October 30, 1991, on what would become The Ballpark in Arlington (now named Globe Life Park in Arlington). Landowners filed lawsuits over the acquisition and eventually won settlements of $22.2 million which the Rangers failed to pay.

Bush left his position with the Rangers when he was elected Governor of Texas in 1994, and was elected the 43rd President of the United States in 2000. Although Bush no longer has any ownership stake in the Rangers, he remains a fan of the team to this day and regularly attends the team's home games.

In 1993, Kevin Kennedy took over managerial duties, presiding over the team for two seasons, keeping the 1993 Rangers in the hunt for a playoff berth into mid-September. Kennedy was let go in 1994, although the team led the A.L. West (with a 52–62 record) prior to the players' strike. The strike prematurely ended what could have been the Rangers' first division championship when commissioner Bud Selig canceled the remainder of the season and the playoffs. Regardless of the unceremonious end to the 1994 season, Kenny Rogers pitched the 12th perfect game in Major League history on July 28.

First success: 1995–2000

The year 1995 saw the beginnings of promise for the Rangers. With a brand new ballpark that hosted its first All-Star Game that year, Johnny Oates was hired as the Rangers' manager. Oates and company promptly helped to bring home the 1996 AL Western Division championship, the first division championship in team history, finally reaching the playoffs in the franchise's 36th season, taking longer than any other team in North American professional sports history to accomplish the feat, 24 years after the franchise came to Texas. The series ultimately saw the Rangers lose to the burgeoning late-90s New York Yankees, three games to one. Oates was named AL Manager of the Year and Juan González was named A.L. MVP. The team featured a powerful lineup of hitters with Iván Rodríguez, Will Clark, Mark McLemore, Dean Palmer, Rusty Greer, Juan González, and Mickey Tettleton but continued to struggle with pitching—a common stereotype of Rangers teams—despite having Rick Helling, and Aaron Sele on their roster. Oates led the team to consecutive A.L. West championships in 1998 and 1999. Neither of Oates' last two playoff teams could win a single game, losing all six in back-to-back sweeps at the hands of the Yankees, a team that won three world championships in the 1990s after defeating Rangers teams in the first round. The 1999 team would be the last playoff-bound team for over a decade, as the Rangers took a step backwards at the beginning of the new millennium. En route to a second straight last-place finish, Oates resigned his position 28 games into the 2001 season. The Rangers finished the decade going 1–9 in the postseason, without a single home win.

In 1998, venture capital billionaire Tom Hicks bought the team for $250 million. Hicks also agreed to pay the $22.2 million awarded in settlements in relation to the 1991 eminent domain litigation concerning the Ballpark in Arlington.

The lean years: 2001–2004

The A-Rod era: 2001–2003

Prior to the 2001 season, star free agent shortstop Alex Rodriguez, was signed by the Rangers in the most lucrative deal in baseball history: a ten-year, $252 million contract. The move was considered controversial and was frequently maligned by fans and writers who thought owner Tom Hicks was placing too much emphasis on one player instead of utilizing team resources to acquire several players, especially for a team that lacked pitching talent. Club officials maintained that Rodriguez would be the cornerstone of future postseason success. Although Rodriguez's individual performance was outstanding, the Rangers continued to struggle and manager Jerry Narron was fired following the 2002 season. He was replaced by seasoned manager Buck Showalter.

The 2003 season signified the fourth straight last-place finish, and after a postseason fallout between Rodriguez and club management, the reigning A.L. MVP and newly appointed Rangers captain was traded to the New York Yankees for second baseman Alfonso Soriano and infielder prospect Joaquin Arias.

In the spring of 2009, Rodriguez admitted to using performance-enhancing drugs during his time with the Rangers. During the investigations into PED use earlier in the decade, several other former Rangers players were criticized for possible use of performance-enhancers. These included notable '90s sluggers Jose Canseco, Iván Rodríguez, Juan González, and Rafael Palmeiro.

2004

Prior to the 2004 season, little hope was held out for the Rangers to improve on their losing ways. However, the Rangers battled with the Los Angeles Angels of Anaheim and Oakland Athletics for first place in the A.L. West for much of the season. Mark Teixeira, Alfonso Soriano, Michael Young, and Hank Blalock became some of the best-hitting infielders in the league, with Young, Blalock, and Soriano were named to the 2004 All-Star Game. Soriano was named the All-Star MVP after going 2for3 with a three-run home run. Late in September, the Oakland A's visited Arlington for a three-game series. After taking the first two games of the series, the Rangers trailed 4–2, in the bottom of the ninth. A loss would have dropped them to four games behind the Athletics. A home run by Hank Blalock and a dramatic two-out, two-run double by David Dellucci (known amongst fans as the "Dellucci Double") gave the Rangers a 5–4 win, one of the most memorable in club history. It also allowed the Rangers to sweep the first-place Athletics and leave them just two games behind with ten to play. Unfortunately, the Rangers ended up losing six of the final ten games and another turnaround season came up short. The club finished in third place behind the Angels and A's, a mere three games out of first place.

2005–2009

2005

In 2005, the Rangers again struggled to find consistency amid controversy and injuries, notwithstanding that the team swept an entire homestand for the first time in its history. Frank Francisco and Carlos Almanzar, two key members of the bullpen, were sidelined for Tommy John surgery. Kenny Rogers, the team's ace pitcher, received a 20-game suspension from commissioner Bud Selig for attacking a cameraman at Ameriquest Field prior to a game. Management later placed opening day starter Ryan Drese on waivers, where he was claimed by the Washington Nationals. After Drese's release and Rogers' suspension, the Rangers' performance on the mound faltered, and a disastrous 1–12 August road trip all but sealed the squad's fate.

On October 4, 2005, the Rangers announced that John Hart would step down as general manager and that Jon Daniels was being promoted from assistant general manager to replace him. Daniels, at 28 years and one month, would become the youngest general manager in Major League history.

Daniels and the Rangers front office were very active in the 2005–06 offseason. Alfonso Soriano, who had often been mentioned in trade speculation, was finally dealt to the Nationals for outfielders Brad Wilkerson and Terrmel Sledge. The Rangers then began making moves to acquire pitching talent. The Rangers gained enigmatic starter Vicente Padilla from the Philadelphia Phillies in exchange for Ricardo Rodríguez and acquired San Diego Padres pitchers Adam Eaton and Akinori Otsuka in exchange for Chris Young, Adrián González, and Sledge. Finally, they signed free agent starter Kevin Millwood to a five-year contract worth $60 million.

2006: Building the brand

The Rangers 2006 season ended with a disappointing 80–82 record and a third-place finish in the West. Though the club showed strength in the early going, the team proved unable to keep pace with the surging Oakland Athletics in the second half and fell out of contention in September. To some extent the Rangers were the victims of bad luck, as their win–loss record was worse than their +51 run differential for the season would normally indicate. However, the element the club continued to lack was a solid pitching staff, whose combined ERA ranked 9th in the A.L. at the season's end. The Rangers were represented in the 2006 All-Star game by center fielder Gary Matthews, Jr. and shortstop Michael Young, who was named the MVP for his game-winning two-run triple in the ninth inning.

Significant player moves in-season included a July 28 deal acquiring outfielders Carlos Lee and Nelson Cruz from the Milwaukee Brewers in exchange for Kevin Mench, Francisco Cordero, and Laynce Nix.

On October 4 after two attempts to replicate the success of the 2004 team, the Rangers dismissed Buck Showalter as manager with three years left on his contract. A month later, the team announced that Oakland Athletics third base coach Ron Washington had accepted their offer to manage the team. A change at manager would be the first of several moves to strengthen the team in yet another busy off-season.

Gary Matthews, Jr., Mark DeRosa, Carlos Lee, and Adam Eaton all signed with other clubs as free agents. Vicente Padilla accepted a three-year, $33 million offer with an option for a fourth year at $12 million. The Rangers also signed 1B/OF Frank Catalanotto to a multi-year deal. The Rangers later added reliever Éric Gagné and veteran outfielders Kenny Lofton and Sammy Sosa on short-term deals. In a sign that GM Jon Daniels was looking for results in 2007, the Rangers' top pitching prospect John Danks was traded to the Chicago White Sox along with reliever Nick Masset for 23-year-old starter Brandon McCarthy. The Danks trade caused quite a stir amongst fans, many of which had followed the minor league careers of the highly touted "DVD" trio of pitchers that included Danks, Edinson Vólquez, and Thomas Diamond. All three pitchers would eventually reach the majors, with varying degrees of success, while McCarthy's career became marred by injury.

The Rangers previously negotiated a 30-year, $75 million stadium naming rights agreement with Ameriquest Mortgage Company in 2004, renaming the Ballpark "Ameriquest Field". Under the Ameriquest moniker, the Ballpark featured a replica of the Liberty Bell in the stands above the Diamond Club (representing Ameriquest's logo) that rang after home runs. In 2007, though, the Rangers announced the termination of the agreement with Ameriquest, and changed the name to Rangers Ballpark in Arlington. Club president Jeff Cogen cited that the team was more concerned about getting their name back on the ballpark than Ameriquest's public financial troubles. "It's all about the brand", Cogen said. The Rangers lost a reported $2.5 million per year from the lack of naming rights but regained advertising space given over to Ameriquest in the naming rights deal. Regardless of Cogen's comments, Ameriquest dissolved within months after the naming rights were terminated, and the company ended most business operations in September 2007.

2007–2009: Financial troubles

The Rangers struggled offensively early in the season, despite playing in a notoriously hitter-friendly park. On June 20, Sammy Sosa hit his 600th career home run against the Chicago Cubs at the Rangers Ballpark in Arlington. Hank Blalock, the starting 3rd baseman who had been enjoying a good season, was placed on the 60-day disabled list on May 19 due to thoracic outlet syndrome, and Mark Teixeira followed him onto the disabled list on June9 (for the first time in his career) with a strained left quadriceps muscle. With a record of 46–59 at the July 31 trade deadline, the team traded Mark Teixeira and Ron Mahay to the Atlanta Braves in a deal that would eventually bring five prospects to the Rangers organization, including four of Atlanta's top prospects Jarrod Saltalamacchia, Elvis Andrus, Matt Harrison, and Neftalí Feliz. The team also traded closer Éric Gagné to the Boston Red Sox for left-hander Kason Gabbard and Minor League outfielders David Murphy and Engel Beltre. These moves were the beginnings of a rebuilding project headed by Jon Daniels with a focus on the acquisition and development of young players. In the coming years, more club resources would be dedicated to improving the quality of the farm system and scouting departments, most notably in Latin America and the Far East. The objective of Daniels' plan was to field a legitimately competitive team by the 2010 season.

The 2007 season remains notable in the minds of baseball fans for two inexplicable oddities. On August 19 at the Metrodome, the Minnesota Twins logged 19 strikeouts against the Rangers, one short of the Major League record. Three days later, the 22nd, in the first game of a doubleheader at Oriole Park at Camden Yards, the Rangers' bats came alive with a modern record for runs by one team, defeating the Baltimore Orioles 30–3. Their 27-run margin of victory is also a modern-day MLB record. Wes Littleton gained probably the easiest save in Major League history—entering the game in the bottom of the seventh, with his team already ahead 14–3, he pitched three innings finishing the game, and gave up just two hits and a walk.

The Rangers began the 2008 season red hot, headlined by newcomer Josh Hamilton who looked to be a threat to win the Triple Crown, before fading off as the season wore on. During the All-Star festivities at Yankee Stadium, Hamilton crushed a first round home run record in the 2008 Home Run Derby with 28. Hamilton hit another four in the second round and three during the final round, for a total of 35 home runs, but lost to the Twins' Justin Morneau. Four Rangers played in the All Star Game: Josh Hamilton, Ian Kinsler, Milton Bradley, and Michael Young, who would repeat his 2006 All-Star Game feat by driving in the winning run via a sac fly.

The Rangers would finish the season with yet another sub-.500 record (79–83), yet ended the season second in the West, the club's best finish since 1999. The off-season saw perennial All-Star shortstop Michael Young ask for a trade when the team told him he would be moving to third base to make room for rookie Elvis Andrus. After speaking with club president Nolan Ryan and his agent, Young later rescinded his trade request, and agreed to move to third base. The offseason also saw the departure of mercurial outfielder/DH Milton Bradley to free agency.

The 2009 season saw the Rangers soar into playoff contention for the first time since 2004. Despite injuries to Josh Hamilton and Ian Kinsler, the Rangers held first place in their division for long stretches of the summer before fading after September 1, losing the division to the Los Angeles Angels. The Rangers finished the season at 87–75, their first winning season since 2004 and good enough for second place in the A.L. West. Michael Young responded to his move to third base by posting one of his best offensive seasons ever while committing just nine errors and earning a sixth straight All-Star appearance. Josh Hamilton and Nelson Cruz were also named 2009 A.L. All-Stars. Several young stars with the club broke out including the debuts of highly rated rookies Elvis Andrus, Derek Holland, and Neftalí Feliz. Second baseman Ian Kinsler hit for the cycle in April, while having a 30–30 season in home runs and stolen bases. Starting pitcher Scott Feldman posted a fantastic season as well in 2009, finishing 3rd in the A.L in wins with 17.

New ownership

While the 2009 season was strong on the field, club owner Tom Hicks became the focus of several reports indicating serious financial problems with his holding group, Hicks Sports Group, which also owned the Dallas Stars, the Frisco RoughRiders (the Rangers AA-farm club),  of Liverpool F.C. (sold in mid-October 2010 to New England Sports Ventures, owners of the Boston Red Sox), and the Mesquite Championship Rodeo (later sold by HSG). HSG was reported to have gone into default on a $525 million loan.

In April 2009, Hicks announced he would be willing to sell a minority interest in the team. Only one month later, Hicks announced he would be willing to sell majority control of the Rangers. In July 2009, it was reported that Hicks borrowed money from Major League Baseball to meet the team's payroll. After the 2009 season, Hicks began scouting prospective buyers and in December, entered into exclusive negotiating rights for sale of the Rangers with a consortium headed by Pittsburgh sports lawyer Chuck Greenberg and Rangers team president Nolan Ryan.

On January 22, 2010, Hicks Sports Group officially reached a formal agreement to sell the Texas Rangers to the group headed by Greenberg and Ryan (later called Rangers Baseball Express) for approximately $570 million. Under the provisions of the deal, former owner Hicks stayed on as a limited minority partner, but was not allowed to retain a seat on the board of governors. Co-lead investors Dallas businessmen Ray Davis, and Ft. Worth Bob R. Simpson were named co-chairmen. Hicks also sold much of the land surrounding Rangers Ballpark to Rangers Baseball Express in a separate deal.

The deal was subject to approval by the other MLB owners (a  vote is required) and completed by April 1. However, one of HSG's principal lenders (Monarch Alternative Capital) opposed the sale on grounds that the proceeds would not fully repay the defaulted HSG notes. On April 21, Major League Baseball issued a statement declaring the Rangers' sale to be under the control of the Commissioner to expedite the process. Because of public comments made by Hicks deemed detrimental to the process, MLB also stripped Hicks of any responsibility regarding the sale of the team. On May 13, MLB threatened to seize control of the rest of the team's operations if a deal was not completed by the deadline set by the Commissioner.

As the stalemate between HSG and its creditors continued, on May 24, 2010, the Texas Rangers filed for Chapter 11 Bankruptcy. As of that date, the Rangers and HSG had an estimated debt of $575 million. Much of the unsecured debt was owed in back salary. Officially, New York Yankees third baseman Alex Rodriguez topped the list of unsecured creditors with an estimated $24.9 million owed by the Rangers. Additionally, the Rangers also owed Baltimore Orioles pitcher Kevin Millwood $12.9 million, and current Rangers third baseman Michael Young $3.9 million. At a press conference, the Greenberg-Ryan group proposed to buy the team for $575 million. The sale would repay all the team's creditors, including players owed back salary.

After several attempts to resolve the deal fell through, the bankruptcy court ordered a public auction to be held on August 4. The Greenberg/Ryan bid would be the opening bid, and other offers (subject to MLB approval) would have to be submitted by the prior day in order to be considered. At the auction, only one other MLB-approved group submitted an offer—Radical Baseball LLC, a group formed by Houston businessman Jim Crane (who was previously unsuccessful in buying the Houston Astros) and Dallas Mavericks owner Mark Cuban (who was previously unsuccessful in buying the Chicago Cubs). The auction lasted until the early morning of August 5, with the winning bid submitted by Greenberg/Ryan. The bankruptcy court approved the bid later that morning and the bankruptcy case closed. The sale to the Greenberg/Ryan was approved by all 30 MLB owners at the owners meeting in Minneapolis on Thursday August 12.

The new ownership group, which included Chuck Greenberg and Nolan Ryan, was called Rangers Baseball Express, LLC and had Greenberg serving as managing general partner and Ryan as club president. Again, co-lead investors Ray Davis and Bob R. Simpson were named co-chairmen. In March 2011, Greenberg resigned as Chief Executive and Managing General Partner and sold his interest in the club following a "falling out" with his partners. Following Greenberg's resignation, Ryan was named Chief Executive Officer in addition to his continuing role as team President. Ryan was subsequently designated the controlling owner of the club by a unanimous vote of the 30 owners of Major League Baseball on May 12, 2011. Co-Chairmen Simpson and Davis stated they would not be involved in day-to-day operations.

2010–present: Rise to contention

First pennant: 2010 

Offseason moves made by the Rangers sent Kevin Millwood to the Baltimore Orioles and acquired free agents Rich Harden, Colby Lewis, and Vladimir Guerrero. With the new influx of talent and success in 2009, the Rangers entered the season with expecting to compete for the division and achieve the front office's goals of 2007. During the offseason, Texas Rangers' team President Nolan Ryan spoke about the Rangers' chances in the upcoming season by saying,

After stumbling out of the gates with a sub-.500 start in April, the Rangers took the division lead with a franchise-best month of June, going 21–6. The Rangers would never relinquish first place after an 11-game winning streak. On July 9, the club dealt one of its top prospects, Justin Smoak, with two other minor leaguers to the Seattle Mariners for former Cy Young Award winner Cliff Lee and Mark Lowe. The Rangers also made moves to acquire veterans Bengie Molina, Jorge Cantú, Cristian Guzmán, and Jeff Francoeur. In the 2010 All-Star Game, the team was represented by Lee, Guerrero, Ian Kinsler, Josh Hamilton, Elvis Andrus, and Neftalí Feliz. After the All-Star Game, came the debut of the claw and antler hand gestures, which gained much popularity, especially after the release of various apparel and souvenir options for the fans. Foam claws and helmets with deer antlers became quite commonplace in the ballpark as the Rangers played further into the fall. The Rangers won the A.L. West on September 25, advancing to the postseason for the first time since 1999.

2010 postseason 

After winning the AL West with a 90–72 record, the Rangers entered the playoffs for the first time since 1999, and faced the Tampa Bay Rays for the first round, which ultimately resulted in a 3–2 series victory and marked the first postseason series victory in the 50-year history of the Rangers/Washington Senators franchise. Facing the Rangers in the American League Championship Series were the defending World Champion New York Yankees, the team the Rangers failed against three separate times in the 1990s. In the playoffs, the Rangers record against the Yankees was 1–9. In a 6-game series, the Texas Rangers came out victorious, winning the first Pennant in franchise history in front of an ecstatic home crowd. Josh Hamilton was awarded ALCS MVP after setting a series record for intentional walks. The Texas Rangers faced the San Francisco Giants in the 2010 World Series. The Rangers offense struggled against the Giants' young pitching and eventually lost the Series 4–1, the lone win coming in Arlington on October 30. For the first time, the Rangers ended their season in the month of November.

2011: Repeat AL champions 

The Rangers successfully defended their AL West Division title in 2011, making the club's second straight division title and postseason appearance and fifth division title and postseason appearance overall. The Rangers set records for best record (96–66 with a .592 winning percentage) and home attendance (2,946,949). On October 15, they went back to the World Series, beating the Detroit Tigers 15–5 in Game6 of the ALCS. The series featured Nelson Cruz hitting six home runs, the most home runs by one player in a playoff series in MLB history. In game two, Cruz also became the first player in postseason history to win a game with a walk-off grand slam as the Rangers defeated the Tigers 7–3 in 11 innings. However, they would proceed to lose the World Series in seven games to the Cardinals.

2012: Staff changes 

The Rangers did a lot of retooling in the 2011–2012 off season. Staff ace C. J. Wilson left the team to join the division rival Los Angeles Angels of Anaheim. The Angels also upgraded their offense with the signing of Albert Pujols, causing more parity within the division. The Rangers responded by signing Yu Darvish of the Nippon Ham Fighters of the Central League in Nippon Professional Baseball of Japan. The team also converted closer Neftalí Feliz to a starting pitcher upon signing Joe Nathan to take over closing duties in the bullpen. The Rangers would not repeat as AL West champions, but would qualify for the postseason as the top wild card team in the AL. They would lose the wild card game to the Orioles.

2013-14: Missed postseasons 

In 2013, the Rangers finished 91–71, which tied them with Tampa Bay for the final wild card position. The Rangers would lose the tie-breaker game to the Rays 5–2. In 2014, the Rangers slumped to their first losing season since 2008. Late in the season, manager Ron Washington resigned, citing personal reasons.

2015-16: Back-to-back AL West champions 

In 2015, under new manager Jeff Banister, the Rangers overcame a slow start to win the AL West. The club was aided by the trade deadline acquisition of pitcher Cole Hamels. On the last day of the regular season, Hamels would pitch a complete game in a victory over the Angels that clinched the division for the Rangers. In the Division Series against the Toronto Blue Jays, the Rangers would win the first two games in Toronto, but then lose three straight to end their season.

In 2016, the Rangers repeated as AL West champions with the best record in the AL. They would face the Blue Jays again in the ALDS. This time, the Blue Jays swept the series.

2017: Missed postseason 

With a returning top bullpen and new recruits, the Rangers had hopes of postseason success. However, they ended their 2017 season 78–84, and tied for 3rd in the AL West.

2018: Staff changes 

The Rangers finished their season 67–95, and finished 5th place in the AL West. With little success the previous seasons, Jeff Banister was fired as club manager. Rangers bench coach, Don Wakamatsu, was promoted to interim manager for the final games of the season. After the season concluded, the Rangers decided on Chris Woodward to be the new team manager.

2019–present: Rebuilding 

This season's opener was on March 28, and it acted as the final opening day game at the stadium. The final season at Globe Life Park (not to be confused with the new Globe Life Field) marked the end of an era. The Ranger's new manager, Chris Woodward, explained the direction of the 2019 season:
 The Rangers finished the 2019 season with a 78–84 record, which placed them third in the American League West.

The club moved into their new stadium, Globe Life Field, for the 2020 season. During the pandemic-shortened 60-game season, the Rangers posted a league-worst 22–38 record. After the season, Elvis Andrus, the last player who had remained with the team after their 2011 World Series run, was traded to the Oakland Athletics.

In 2021, the Rangers once again finished last in the AL West with a 60–102 record. The 2022 season, despite the acquisitions of middle infielders Marcus Semien and Corey Seager, saw minimal improvement for the club, as they finished fourth with a 68–94 record.

References

 
Texas Rangers